Events from the year 1316 in the Kingdom of Scotland.

Incumbents
 Monarch – Robert I

Events
 26 January – Battle of Skerries
 February – Battle of Skaithmuir

Births
 2 March – Robert II of Scotland, future king of Scotland (died 1390)

Deaths
 2 March – Marjorie Bruce, daughter of Robert I (1296/7–1316)
 26 November – Robert Wishart, Bishop of Glasgow (1271–1316)

See also

 Timeline of Scottish history

References

 
Years of the 14th century in Scotland
Wars of Scottish Independence